C.E.Henriod & Cie and Automobiles Henriod & Cie (founded 1898) of Neuilly-sur-Seine, France were enterprises of pioneering Swiss automotive engineer, Charles-Edouard Henriod born Fleurier, Switzerland 22 May 1866 died Lausanne 18 November 1941 and his brother Fritz.

Henriod patented numerous inventions such as a gearbox on the back axle and front wheel drive. His inventions were made by automotive manufacturers in France and U.S.A.

References

Automotive companies of France
Vehicle manufacturing companies established in 1898
1898 establishments in France